Simone Stella (born 1981 in Florence, Italy) is an Italian harpsichordist, organist, composer and producer.

Biography 

He studied piano in Florence with Rosanita Racugno and Marco Vavolo, organ in Florence with Mariella Mochi and Alessandro Albenga, organ improvisation with Fausto Caporali and Stefano Rattini in Cremona, harpsichord in Rome with Francesco Cera and, in specializing master courses, with Ton Koopman, Matteo Imbruno, Luigi Ferdinando Tagliavini, Luca Scandali, Giancarlo Parodi, Stefano Innocenti, Klemens Schnorr, Ludger Lohmann, Michel Bouvard, Monika Henking, and Guy Bovet.

Career 

After winning some major organ competitions in Italy (the 2nd and 3rd Alessandro Esposito Youth Organ Competitions (Lucca, 2004–05), and the 1st Agati-Tronci International Organ Competition (Pistoia, 2008, the president of the jury was Gustav Leonhardt), he started an international career as concert soloist that brought him performing through Europe, U.S.A. and Brazil, where he also held some masterclasses.

In 2009, he started an intense activity as recording artist, producing various discs of harpsichord and organ music. Many of his recordings have been acclaimed by the international press (Musica, Diapason, BBC Music Magazine, Klassik.com, Fanfare among others).

As a composer, he published some of his works for the publisher Armelin of Padua.

Stella is a secular member of the Order of Servants of St. Mary, and since 2011 is the titular organist of the historical instruments in the Church of Santissima Annunziata, Florence.

Recordings 

 2009: Georg Friedrich Händel, Suites for harpsichord, book 1, 2 CD, OnClassical (OC33-34B).
 2011: Dietrich Buxtehude, Complete Harpsichord Music, 4 CD, OnClassical (OC51-54Bv), Brilliant Classics (94312).
 2012: Dietrich Buxtehude, Complete Organ Music, 6 CD, OnClassical (OC61-66Bv), Brilliant Classics (94422).
 2013: Georg Böhm, Complete Harpsichord and Organ Music, 4 CD, OnClassical (OC72-75B), Brilliant Classics (94612).
 2013: Luigi Cherubini, Sei Sonate per cimbalo, un CD, Amadeus Rainbow.
 2014: Johann Adam Reincken, Complete Harpsichord and Organ Music, 3 CD, OnClassical (OC84-86B), Brilliant Classics (94606).
 2015: Johann Gottfried Walther, Complete Organ Music, 12 CD, Brilliant Classics (94730).
 2015: Various Composers: Toccata and Fugue in D minor, BWV 565 & other works, 1 CD, OnClassical (OC95B)
 2016: Jean-Philippe Rameau: Complete Harpsichord Music, 2 CD, OnClassical (OC130BSET)
 2016: Johann Jakob Froberger: Complete Music for Harpsichord and Organ, 16 CD, Brilliant Classics (94740)
 2016: Johann Sebastian Bach: Organ Works BWV 538, 542, 545, 565, 572, 582, 590, 1 CD, OnClassical (OC150B)
 2018: Federico Maria Sardelli: Suites pour le Clavecin, 1 CD, Brilliant Classics (95488)
 2019: Johann Pachelbel: Complete Keyboard Music, 13 CD, Brilliant Classics (95623)
 2021: Friedrich Wilhelm Zachow: Complete Organ Music, 2 CD, Brilliant Classics (96022)
 2021: Carlo Antonio Campioni: 6 Sonatas for Harpsichord, 1 CD, Brilliant Classics (95997)
 2021: Giovanni Picchi: Complete Harpsichord Music and other Venetian gems, 1 CD, Brilliant Classics (95998)

External links
 Personal page with curriculum, reviews, photos, audio files at OnClassical

1981 births
Living people
Musicians from Florence
Italian harpsichordists
Italian classical organists
Male classical organists
21st-century organists
21st-century Italian male musicians